South American Cookin' is an album by jazz trombonist Curtis Fuller, released in 1961 on the Epic label. It contains a version of One Note Samba, the Antônio Carlos Jobim that was made famous in North America when Stan Getz recorded it the following year.

Reception

The Allmusic website awarded the album 3 stars.

Track listing
 "Hello, Young Lovers" (Oscar Hammerstein II, Richard Rodgers) - 5:20  
 "Bésame Mucho" (Sunny Skylar, Consuelo Velázquez) - 9:13  
 "Willow Weep for Me" (Ann Ronell) - 6:43  
 "One Note Samba" (Antonio Carlos Jobim, Newton Mendonça) - 4:11  
 "Wee Dot" (J. J. Johnson, Leo Parker) - 6:48  
 "Autumn Leaves" (Joseph Kosma, Johnny Mercer, Jacques Prévert) - 7:09

Personnel 
 Curtis Fuller - trombone
 Zoot Sims - tenor saxophone
 Tommy Flanagan - piano
 Jymie Merritt - bass
 Dave Bailey - drums

References 

1961 albums
Curtis Fuller albums
Epic Records albums
Albums produced by Mike Berniker